Island Grove Township may refer to one of the following places in the United States:

 Island Grove Township, Sangamon County, Illinois
 Island Grove Township, Gage County, Nebraska

Township name disambiguation pages